Cyrtostylis tenuissima, commonly known as dwarf gnat orchid or dwarf mosquito orchid, is a species of orchid endemic to Western Australia. It usually has a single more or less round leaf and a flowering spike with up to fourteen small, green flowers with a greenish brown to pinkish, wedge-shaped labellum.

Description
The leaf is green on both surfaces. The lateral sepals are a similar size to the lateral sepals, turn downwards and often cross over each other. Flowering occurs from September to November.

Taxonomy and naming
The dwarf gnat orchid was first formally described in 1933 by William Henry Nicholls and Bede Goadby who gave it the name Acianthus tenuissimus. The description was published in The Victorian Naturalist from a specimen collected near Bayswater. In 1987 David Jones and Mark Clements changed the name to Cyrtostylis tenuissima.
The specific epithet (tenuissima) is the superlative form of the Latin word tenuis meaning "thin", hence "thinnest".

Distribution and habitat
The dwarf gnat orchid grows under shrubs and grasstrees around winter-wet areas between Perth and Albany with disjunct populations near Esperance.

Conservation
Cyrtostylis tenuissima is listed as "not threatened" by the Western Australian Government Department of Parks and Wildlife.

References

External links
 

tenuissima
Endemic orchids of Australia
Orchids of Western Australia
Plants described in 1933